Peter Lieou also known as Liu Wenyuan Petrus / Baiduo / Peter Liu Wenyuan was Chinese layman, Convert, missionary and a martyr. He was exiled and was strangled to death in a prison for being a christian and preaching Christianity in China.

Early life 
Lieou was born in Guizhou, China in 1760. Peter was a married man who converted to Christianity and then became a catechist in the church.

Persecution 
Peter was warned by authorities about his practice of faith and preaching and finally because of his faith he was exiled to Mongolia in 1814.  He was allowed to return from exile in 1827 and as soon as he came back, he started working with Catholic missionaries. Many Christians were made prisoners once again with the fresh persecution of Christianity in China. Peter was able to evade arrest initially but was soon caught ministering to prisoners, his sons were also among the other prisoners in the prison.

Martyrdom 
Peter was martyred by strangling to death on May 17, 1834 in Guiyang, China.

Canonization 
On 2 July 1899, Peter was venerated and declared a martyr by Pope Leo XIII. Pope Leo XIII beatified him in 1900. He was finally canonized and declared a saint on 1 October 2000 by Pope John Paul II.

References 

1760 births
1834 deaths
Catholic saints
Catholic martyrs
Chinese Catholics
Chinese saints
18th-century executions
Chinese Roman Catholic saints